Andrei Dmitriyevich Deputat (born 20 December 1992) is a Ukrainian-Russian pair skater who has represented Russia internationally since 2012. With former partner Vasilisa Davankova, he is the 2012 World Junior bronze medalist, the 2012–13 JGP Final silver medalist, and the 2012 Russian Junior champion. He later competed with Vera Bazarova.

Personal life 
Deputat was born on 20 December 1992 in Kyiv, Ukraine. He moved to Moscow, Russia, in early 2010. He married Russian ice dancer Ekaterina Bobrova on 16 July 2016 in Moscow.

Early career 
Deputat's mother, a recreational skater, introduced him to skating at age two years and eight months. He switched from singles to pair skating at age 15 and competed for two seasons with Vladyslava Rybka. They represented Ukraine and were coached by Galina Kukhar in Kyiv. In the summer of 2009, they spent some time training in Ashburn, Virginia with Rashid Kadyrkaev and competed at the Liberty Summer Competition in Aston, Pennsylvania where they won the silver medal. They were ineligible for the 2009–10 ISU Junior Grand Prix series because Rybka turned 12 at the end of July 2009 and they parted ways soon after.

Unable to find him a suitable partner in Ukraine, Kukhar recommended that Deputat move to Moscow. Arriving in Russia in early 2010, Deputat joined Sergei Dobroskokov's group and had a brief partnership with Polina Safronova.

Partnership with Davankova 
Deputat and Vasilisa Davankova skated in the same group before teaming up in May 2011.

2011–12 season 
In December 2011, Davankova/Deputat competed on the senior level at the 2012 Russian Championships. They were seventh in the short program but finished fifth overall, receiving the highest TES in the free skate ahead of the gold medalists Vera Bazarova / Yuri Larionov. In February 2012, they won the gold medal at the 2012 Russian Junior Championships after placing first in both the short and free segments. Deputat was released by Ukraine to represent Russia. Davankova/Deputat won the bronze medal in their international debut at the 2012 World Junior Championships.

2012–13 season 
Davankova/Deputat won silver at their first JGP event in Lake Placid, New York. At their second event, in Zagreb, Croatia, they took the bronze and qualified for the JGP Final in Sochi, Russia, where they won the silver medal behind Lina Fedorova / Maxim Miroshkin. By that time, Davankova had grown to 1.55 m. Davankova/Deputat finished seventh in their second appearance at the 2013 Russian Championships. In January 2013, Davankova injured her leg at a training session, resulting in the pair withdrawing from the 2013 Russian Junior Championships. She was on crutches for two weeks. In late March, Deputat injured his right leg and decided to undergo a meniscus operation.

2013–14 season 
Davankova/Deputat began their season by winning bronze at the 2013 JGP Belarus. A silver medal at the 2013 JGP Estonia qualified them to the JGP Final in Fukuoka, Japan. At the final, Davankova/Deputat placed fifth in both segments and overall. At the Russian Championships, the pair finished fifth on the senior level and then won the bronze medal on the junior level. Davankova/Deputat were assigned to the 2014 World Junior Championships in Sofia, Bulgaria, where they finished fourth after placing third in the short program and fifth in the free skate. Their partnership ended because Deputat was struggling with elements as Davankova grew taller.

Partnership with Bazarova 
On 9 April 2014, Russian media reported that Deputat and Vera Bazarova would skate together, coached by Oleg Vasiliev. On 16 April, Deputat said their partnership was officially approved by the Russian Figure Skating Federation and they would begin training in Saint Petersburg under Vasiliev. In May, Vasiliev said they would relocate to Moscow and Saransk because of better funding.

2014–15 season 
Bazarova/Deputat were awarded the bronze medal at the 2014 CS Lombardia Trophy and silver at the International Cup of Nice. They received two Grand Prix assignments, the 2014 Cup of China and 2014 NHK Trophy, and placed 4th at both. The pair finished 5th at the 2015 Russian Championships.

2015–16 season 
Competing in the 2015–16 Grand Prix series, Bazarova/Deputat finished 5th at the 2015 Skate Canada International finishing 5th and 4th at the 2015 NHK Trophy. In December 2015, the pair placed 6th at the 2016 Russian Championships. In March 2016, they won gold at the inaugural Cup of Tyrol in Innsbruck, Austria.

2016–17 season 
Bazarova/Deputat withdrew from their 2016–17 Grand Prix assignment, the 2016 Skate Canada International. On 17 November 2016, their coach announced that the partnership had ended and that Deputat was doing tryouts with various skaters, including Alexandra Proklova.

Programs

With Bazarova

With Davankova

Competitive highlights 
GP: Grand Prix; CS: Challenger Series; JGP: Junior Grand Prix

With Bazarova

With Davankova

Detailed results
Small medals for short and free programs awarded only at ISU Championships.

With Bazarova

With Davankova

References

External links 

 
 

Ukrainian male pair skaters
Russian male pair skaters
1992 births
Living people
Sportspeople from Kyiv
World Junior Figure Skating Championships medalists
Competitors at the 2015 Winter Universiade